Below is a list of the 1st National Assembly of the Republic of Namibia. The members were in the National Assembly from independence on 21 March 1990 until the 1994 elections.

Selection
Members are chosen by their parties. Parties are voted in via proportional representation.

South West Africa People's Organization

 Asser Kuveri Kapere - Chairperson
 Mose Penaani Tjitendero - Speaker
 Hage Geingob
 Hendrik Witbooi
 Ben Amathila
 Libertine Amathila
 Solly Amadhila
 Helmut Angula
 Nahas Angula
 H Ausiku
 Nico Bessinger
 Willem Biwa
 Danie Botha
 Klaus Dierks
 Jerry Ekandjo
 Moses ǁGaroëb
 Theo-Ben Gurirab
 Hidipo Hamutenya
 Gert Hanekom
 Marco Hausiku
 Otto Herrigel
 Hadino Hishongwa
 Joshua Hoebeb
 Michaela Hübschle
 Pendukeni Iivula-Ithana
 Nangolo Ithete
 Nickey Iyambo
 Richard Kapelwa Kabajani
 Peter Katjavivi
 Willem Konjore
 Barmenas Rikurura Kukuri
 Philemon Malima
 Nathaniel Maxuilili
 Kaire Mbuende
 David Meroro
 Peter Mweshihange
 J Nathaniel
 K Nauyala
 John Ya Otto
 Hifikepunye Pohamba
 Hartmut Ruppel
 Pashukeni Shoombe
 Ngarikutuke Tjiriange
 Andimba Toivo ya Toivo
 Peter Tsheehama
 Buddy Wentworth
 Anton Von Wietersheim
 Siegfried Wohler

Democratic Turnhalle Alliance

 Mishake Muyongo
 Dirk Mudge
 Ben Africa
 L "Barney" Barnes
 Magareth Barnes
 Allois Gende
 Jeremia Jagger
 Petrus Junius (resigned)
 Geelboy Kashe
 Constance Kgosiemang
 Fanuel Kozonguizi
 Daniel Luipert
 Andrew Matjila
 Hans Erik Staby

United Democratic Front
 Justus ǁGaroëb
 Eric Biwa
 Reggie Diergaardt

Action Christian National
 Kosie Pretorius
 Jan de Wet

Federal Convention of Namibia
 Mburumba Kerina

Namibia National Front
 Vekuii Rukoro

National Patriotic Front
 Moses Katjioungua

References
 Official list National Assembly of Namibia

History of Namibia
Government of Namibia
1st